Autumn Marathon is a 1979 Soviet romantic comedy-drama, a winner of 1979 Venice Film Festival, San Sebastian Film Festival and 1980 Berlin Film Festival awards in the best director and best actor categories. It was also selected as the Soviet entry for the Best Foreign Language Film at the 52nd Academy Awards, but was not accepted as a nominee.

It starred Oleg Basilashvili as Andrei Bouzykine, a married English-to-Russian translator in Leningrad who is going through a mid-life crisis and struggling to stand up for himself in his tangled relationships with his wife, mistress, neighbors, and co-workers. The cast included such notable Soviet performers as Yevgeny Leonov, Natalya Gundareva, Marina Neyolova, Borislav Brondukov, Nikolai Kryuchkov, and Galina Volchek. It was directed by Georgiy Daneliya.

Cast
 Oleg Basilashvili as Andrey Pavlovich Buzykin
 Natalya Gundareva as Nina Yevlampyevna Buzykina
 Marina Neyolova as Alla Mikhaylovna Yermakova – Buzykin's Mistress
 Yevgeny Leonov as Vasily Ignatyevich Kharitonov – Buzykin's Neighbour
 Norbert Kuchinke as Bill Hansen, Danish Professor
 Nikolai Kryuchkov as Uncle Kolya, Alla's Neighbour
 Galina Volchek as Varvara Nikitichna
 Olga Bogdanova as Yelena – Buzykin's Daughter (as O.Bogdanova)

See also
 List of submissions to the 52nd Academy Awards for Best Foreign Language Film
 List of Soviet submissions for the Academy Award for Best Foreign Language Film

References

External links

1979 films
1970s romantic comedy-drama films
Soviet romantic comedy-drama films
Russian romantic comedy-drama films
1970s Russian-language films
Mosfilm films
Films directed by Georgiy Daneliya
Films scored by Andrey Petrov
Films shot in Saint Petersburg
Films set in Saint Petersburg
Films set in the Soviet Union
1979 comedy-drama films